The U.S. Marine Corps Forces Cyberspace Command (abbreviated as MARFORCYBER) is a functional formation of the United States Marine Corps to protect critical infrastructure from cyberattack. Marine Corps Forces Cyberspace Command is the Marine Corps component to U.S. Cyber Command. It comprises a command element, the Marine Corps Cyber Operations Group, and the Marine Corps Cyber Warfare Group, a total of approximately 800 personnel. MARFORCYBER was established on January 21, 2010 under the command of LtGen George J. Flynn,. As of 7 July 2021, MajGen Ryan P. Heritage is in command.

Overview
The Secretary of Defense recognized the significance of the cyberspace domain to national security, and directed the establishment of CYBERCOM as a sub-unified command under STRATCOM. CYBERCOM's primary objective is to integrate the cyberspace operations capabilities of the services and agencies in support of the National Strategy to Secure Cyberspace (NSSC).

In response, the Marine Corps established MARFORCYBER in October 2009 (this was complemented by the standing up of the Fleet Cyber Command, U.S. Army Cyber Command (ARCYBER), and Air Force Cyberspace Command (AFCYBER). MARFORCYBER's mission, in addition to its standard service component responsibilities, is to: plan, coordinate, integrate, synchronize, and direct the Corps' full spectrum of cyberspace operations. This includes Department of Defense (DoD) Information Network (DoDIN) operations, Defensive Cyber Operations (DCO), and planning and, when required, executing Offensive Cyberspace Operations (OCO). These operations support MAGTF, Joint and combined cyberspace requirements that enable freedom of action across all warfighting domains and deny the same to adversarial forces.

Subordinate Units

Marine Corps Cyberspace Operations Group

MCCOG directs global Network Operations (NETOPS) and computer network defense of the Marine Corps Enterprise Network (MCEN) and to provide technical leadership in support of Marine and joint forces operating worldwide. The MCCOG is also responsible for intelligence gathering and analysis to develop future capabilities planning in accordance with DCO.

The MCCOG is the Computer Network Defense Service Provider (CNDSP) and serves as the Corps' Global Network Operations and Security Center (GNOSC). The MCCOG provides 24/7 NETOPS C2 through its Operations Center. Under the OPCON (operational command) of MARFORCYBER, the MCCOG executes Information NETOPS and DCO in support of operational requirements in order to enhance freedom of action across all warfighting domains, while denying the efforts of adversaries to degrade or disrupt this advantage through cyberspace.

Key MCCOG tasks include:
 operating and defending the MCEN
 collecting and sharing DoDIN Situational Awareness
 reporting and directing actions that proactively address threats and vulnerabilities
 responding to operational incidents
 providing technical leadership to ensure that our Corps and joint capabilities leverage new technologies to the advantage of the Marine warfighter

Marine Corps Cyber Warfare Group

MCCYWG is an administrative headquarters that organizes, trains, equips, provides administrative support, manages readiness of assigned forces, and recommends certification and presentation of Cyber Mission Force (CMF) Teams to U.S. Cyber Command.

Key MCCYWG tasks include:
 Conduct personnel management to organize and assign individuals to work roles and place them in work centers to ensure operational readiness of CMF Teams
 Ensure all personnel are trained in accordance with USCYBERCOM Joint Cyberspace Training and Certification Standards and equipped to perform all duties and tasks outlined in the MARFORCYBER Mission Essential Task List (METL)
 Advise COMMARFORCYBER on force employment considerations
 Provide subject matter expertise for operational planning requirements

Marine Corps Information Command

The Marine Corps Information Command (MARCOR INFOCOM)  was established on 1 October 2022 to provide the Marine Corps with an operational command that was capable of unifying information-related capabilities and functions to support Fleet Marine Forces (FMF) in competition and crisis.  Creation of MARFOR INFOCOM was directed by the Commandant of the Marine Corps in the May 2022 Annual Update to Force Design 2030.   MARCOR INFOCOM is not “subordinate” to MARFOR CYBERCOM, but the Commander of MARFOR CYBERCOM also serves as the Commanding General (CG) of MARCOR INFOCOM.

MARCOR INFOCOM comprises a headquarters staff and the following units:
 Marine Corps Information Operations Center (MCIOC)
 Marine Cryptologic Support Battalion (MCSB)
 Marine Cryptologic Office (MCO)
 Littoral Operations Cyber Cell (LOCC)

List of commanders

References

See also
 List of cyber warfare forces

Cyberspace
United States Cyber Command